Oil and Water is a 1913 film directed by D. W. Griffith and starring Blanche Sweet.  The supporting cast includes Henry B. Walthall, Lionel Barrymore, and Harry Carey.  A stage dancer (Sweet) and a serious-type homebody (Walthall) discover, after marriage, that their individual styles don't mesh.  The movie includes elaborate dance sequences.

The film was exhibited at the Museum of Modern Art in New York City in July 2007 as part of a Biograph studio retrospective.

Cast
 Blanche Sweet - Mlle. Genova
 Henry B. Walthall - The Idealist
 Lionel Barrymore - In First Audience/In Second Audience/Visitor
 Walter Miller - The Idealist's Brother, a Minister
 Clara T. Bracy - The Nurse
 Harry Carey - Stage Manager/At Dinner
 Gertrude Bambrick - Among Dancers
 Kathleen Butler - In First Audience/Among Dancers
 William J. Butler - Among Dancers
 John T. Dillon - In Second Audience/At Dinner
 Frank Evans - In First Audience/In Second Audience
 Dorothy Gish - In First Audience
 Lillian Gish - In First Audience
 Robert Harron
 J. Jiquel Lanoe - In First Audience / Among Dancers
 Adolph Lestina - In Second Audience
 Charles Hill Mailes
 Joseph McDermott - Actor in Play/At Dinner
 W. Chrystie Miller - In First Audience
 Antonio Moreno - Actor in Play
 Alfred Paget - Among Dancers
 Matt Snyder - In First Audience (*aka Matt B. Snyder)
 Charles West - In First Audience/In Second Audience

See also
 Harry Carey filmography
 D. W. Griffith filmography
 Lillian Gish filmography
 Blanche Sweet filmography
 Lionel Barrymore filmography

References

External links

1913 films
American silent short films
Biograph Company films
American black-and-white films
1913 drama films
1910s English-language films
Films directed by D. W. Griffith
1913 short films
Silent American drama films
1910s American films